Bonțida (transl. "Bonc's bridge") is a commune in Cluj County, Transylvania, Romania. It is known as the home of a Baroque castle owned by the Bánffy family (of which Miklós Bánffy was a member); partly destroyed during World War II and neglected by the communist regime in Romania, it is currently being restored.

The Bánffy family had another castle in Răscruci, which is part of Bonțida and also the birthplace of poet Albert Wass. The Răscruci castle features in the reminiscences of an English governess, Florence Tarring, who worked for one of the branches of the Bánffy family during the First World War (1914-1919).

The commune is composed of four villages: Bonțida, Coasta (Gyulatelke), Răscruci (Válaszút) and Tăușeni (Marokháza).

Demographics 
According to the census from 2002 there was a total population of 4,722 people living in this town. Of this population, 65.07% are ethnic Romanians, 19.10% are ethnic Hungarians and 15.75% ethnic Romani.

Natives
Ștefan Emilian
Dorel Vișan
Albert Wass

See also
 Bonțida Bánffy Castle
 Răscruci Bánffy Castle

References 

Communes in Cluj County
Localities in Transylvania
Bánffy family